The Roman Catholic Diocese of Kpalimé is a diocese located in the city of Kpalimé in the Ecclesiastical province of Lomé in Togo.

History
 July 1, 1994: Established as Diocese of Kpalimé from the Metropolitan Archdiocese of Lomé

Special churches
The Cathedral is the Cathédrale Saint-Esprit in Kpalimé.

Leadership
 Bishops of Kpalimé (Roman rite)
 Bishop Pierre Koffi Seshie (July 1, 1994 – April 25, 2000)
 Bishop Benoît Comlan Messan Alowonou (since July 4, 2001)

See also
Roman Catholicism in Togo

Sources
 GCatholic.org
 Catholic Hierarchy

Roman Catholic dioceses in Togo
Roman Catholic Ecclesiastical Province of Lomé
Christian organizations established in 1994
Roman Catholic dioceses and prelatures established in the 20th century
Kpalimé